Kunszentmárton is a small town of the county of Jász-Nagykun-Szolnok, central Hungary.

Geography
Körös River crosses the town from the north-east to the south.

Twin towns – sister cities

Kunszentmárton is twinned with:
 Teterow, Germany

References

External links

  in Hungarian

Populated places in Jász-Nagykun-Szolnok County